Parides gundlachianus, the Cuban cattleheart, is a species of butterfly in the family Papilionidae. It is an endemic species found only in Cuba. The name honours the Cuban naturalist Juan Gundlach.

It is the brightest-coloured American swallowtail, and may be recognised by the brilliant blue bands on the forewing.
The ground colour is brown to black. The upperside forewing has a blue to green median band and possibly one to two spots close to the apex. The hindwings have a long tail and on either side two indentations like short tails. The upperside hindwing has a broad red submarginal band. A full description is provided by Rothschild, W. and Jordan, K. (1906)

The dark ash-grey larva is striped longitudinally, the head and thoracic legs are black; the black longitudinal stripes in part margined with white; the anterior and posterior segments bear long pointed tubercles which are partly white.

Occurs in the mountainous eastern part of the island, especially near the coast, where it is met with on flowers, and sometimes also drinking at pools.

Subspecies
Parides gundlachianus gundlachianus (eastern Cuba)
Parides gundlachianus alayoi Hernández, Alayón & Smith, 1995 (western Cuba)

Taxonomy

Parides gundlachianus is a member of the ascanius species group  ("Fringe-spots white. Hindwing with submarginal spots and usnally also diseal spots or dots, or a discal band ;mostly with tail") A quadrate whitish spot in space 2 of the forewings is quite peculiar of the ascanius group

The members are
Parides agavus (Drury, 1782)
Parides alopius (Godman & Salvin, [1890]) 
Parides ascanius (Cramer, [1775]) 
Parides bunichus (Hübner, [1821])
Parides gundlachianus (C. & R. Felder, 1864) 
Parides montezuma (Westwood, 1842) 
Parides phalaecus (Hewitson, 1869)
Parides photinus (Doubleday, 1844) 
Parides proneus (Hübner, [1831])

Status
Found only in forests in Cuba and not rare but requiring monitoring.

Etymology
The specific epithet honours the Cuban naturalist Juan Gundlach.

See also
 List of Lepidoptera of Cuba

References

Hamilton A. Tyler; Keith S. Brown; Kent H. Wilson 1992 Swallowtail Butterflies of the Americas  Scientific Pub 
Lewis, H. L., 1974 Butterflies of the World  Page 26, figure 4 as columbus, figure 10 as gundlachianus.

Further reading

External links
Butterflies of America: Parides gundlachianus—type specimens
Parides gundlachianus

gundlachianus
Butterflies of Cuba
Endemic fauna of Cuba
Taxa named by Juan Gundlach
Butterflies described in 1864